Ravi S. Rajan is an American artist and academic administrator working as the fourth president of the California Institute of the Arts.

Early life and education
The son of immigrants from India, Rajan was born in Seattle and raised in Norman, Oklahoma. His father, a physicist, came to the U.S. to study atmospheric sciences at Colorado State University then the University of Washington. Rajan attended the Norman Public Schools and graduated from Norman High, then earned a Bachelor’s degree in music education from the University of Oklahoma and a Master’s in Music from Yale University.

Career
Rajan began his career as a music teacher in the Norman Public Schools. After graduating from Yale, Rajan moved to New York City, where he worked as a designer for Rockefeller University, performed in Broadway shows, and offered private trumpet lessons.

As a trumpet player, Rajan has performed in various musical ensembles in large orchestral, big band, and chamber settings, as well as for theatre on and off Broadway. He was a member of the Tony Awards Nominating Committee.

Rajan was previously dean of the school of the arts, and before that, director of Art+Design and associate dean of the arts at State University of New York at Purchase.

As a producer and designer of large-scale projects and installations, he has worked in major museums, biennials, theaters, festivals, galleries, and venues around the world, for artists including Alfredo Jaar, Stephen Petronio, and Laura Poitras.

In 2010, Rajan was elected a fellow of the Royal Society of Arts. As the fourth president of CalArts, Rajan replaced Steven Lavine, who served as president for 29 years.

Service
Rajan is and has been a volunteer leader for many causes that support the arts, education, and social justice including Americans for the Arts; Asian American Arts Alliance; American Brass Chamber Music Association (ABQ); the National Association of Independent Colleges and Universities; the Association of Independent California Colleges and Universities; the Association of Independent Colleges of Art and Design; the National Association of Schools of Art and Design; the American Theater Wing; and Yale University.

References

Living people
American trumpeters
American male trumpeters
21st-century trumpeters
American musicians
American male musicians
21st-century American male musicians
American artists
American male artists
21st-century American male artists
Year of birth missing (living people)
State University of New York at Purchase faculty
Yale University people
Yale University alumni
Yale School of Music alumni
University of Oklahoma alumni
University of Oklahoma people